Merry Christmas, Drake & Josh (also known as Drake & Josh: Best Christmas Ever) is a 2008 American Christmas comedy television film based on the Nickelodeon sitcom Drake & Josh. Drake Bell, Josh Peck, Miranda Cosgrove, Nancy Sullivan, and Jonathan Goldstein reappear as their respective characters, with several recurring characters from the TV series also reappearing. The movie aired on Nickelodeon a year after the show's original end in 2007.
The film premiered on December 5, 2008, as a Nickelodeon Original Movie. It was the third most viewed TV movie on cable behind High School Musical 2 and Wizards of Waverly Place: The Movie, both owned by Disney Channel.

Plot
As Christmas approaches, Walter and Audrey leave for a tropical vacation, leaving their kids, Drake, Josh, and Megan, alone at home. Drake plans to hold a party on the roof of Josh’s workplace, the Premiere theater. Josh’s boss Helen approves on the condition that Drake dresses as Santa at the mall. While hiding from a woman looking to kiss him, Drake accidentally makes an unbreakable promise to a little girl named Mary Alice to give her family the best Christmas ever.

The party is crashed by uninvited guests whom Josh calls the cops on, but a mix-up results in Josh getting arrested. He bonds with his cellmate, Bludge, who pretends to beat Josh up to maintain his tough-guy image in front of the other convicts. Knowing he must fulfill his promise after Mary Alice tells him about her sick foster mom and busy foster dad, Drake attempts to break out Josh to help him, only to get caught and arrested. Acting as Drake and Josh’s lawyer, Helen informs the judge of Drake’s promise to Mary Alice, who decides they will not be sent to jail as long as they fulfill it. Afterwards, they meet their cruel and embittered parole officer Perry Gilbert, who says he will take a vote from Mary Alice’s foster family if they had the best Christmas ever; if any of them vote “no”, Drake and Josh go back to jail.

The duo meet Mary Alice’s foster family, which include frequently feuding twins Lily and Violet, foreign boy Zigfee who speaks an unknown language, know-it-all Trey, and Mary Alice’s rebellious, loner older brother Luke. Gilbert sabotages the duo’s attempts to give Mary Alice’s family the best Christmas ever, so Drake bribes Megan with his friend Trevor’s rare Royal Smith oboe passed down from his grandfather. Megan agrees, but reneges upon discovering it was a lie.

After receiving several more tickets from Gilbert, the brothers find that he wanted a live pet chimpanzee for Christmas, but it attacked him and fled when he was a child, causing him to hate Christmas ever since. Drake and Josh then attempt to get the children into caroling, leading them to enter a Christmas parade Drake had shunned earlier. At the parade, Gilbert tricks Josh’s co-worker Crazy Steve into loudly reminding them to keep their promise or else they’ll be arrested; believing Drake and Josh were only being nice to avoid punishment, Mary Alice and her family leave, heartbroken.

Still determined to keep their promise, Drake and Josh borrow Steve’s woodchipper (“Sally”) to make it snow in front of Mary Alice’s house by putting ice in the machine, but they inadvertently shoot large chunks across the neighborhood. In trying to stop the machine, the brothers are knocked unconscious, but are brought home by Gilbert, who was gifted a nice chimpanzee secretly by Josh and had become nicer as a result.

The brothers enter the living room the next morning, where Mary Alice’s family surprises them, having learned the truth from Gilbert. Everyone votes “yes”, and the charges against Drake and Josh are dropped. Bludge, dressed as Santa, comes down the chimney to deliver gifts to everyone, including a real Royal Smith oboe for Megan. Walter and Audrey return home from their vacation, which turned out to be a small hut that blew away in a tropical storm. Steve gets Sally to make snow using hard cheese, and everyone enjoys Christmas by playing in the “cheese snow”.

Cast

From the TV show
The show's vast majority of recurring characters returned for the special, all played by their original actors. Crazy Steve takes a more major role in this film, having a larger role in the film than Audrey or Walter.

Movie only
These characters all have a larger role than most characters, second only to Drake, Josh, and Megan.

Music
The opening theme for the movie entitled "Christmas Promise" was composed and performed by Drake & Josh series composer Backhouse Mike. Miranda Cosgrove did a cover of "Christmas Wrapping", and the song became the single of the movie, but no soundtrack was released. The cast featuring Drake Bell, Josh Peck, and the kids do a cover of "12 Days of Christmas" in the movie. Drake Bell made a music video for his cover of "Jingle Bells" which promoted the movie and can be seen on the DVD.

Home media
The film was released on DVD on December 19, 2008.

Nielsen ratings
The premiere of Merry Christmas, Drake & Josh broke the record of most viewers for the premiere of a Nickelodeon Movie with 8.10 million viewers, a title previously held by iGo to Japan.

References

External links

 IMDb's Merry Christmas, Drake & Josh
 TV.com's Merry Christmas, Drake & Josh
 TV Guide.com's Drake & Josh episode listings

2008 films
2008 television films
All articles with unsourced statements
Drake & Josh
American teen comedy films
American Christmas films
American television series finales
Nickelodeon original films
2000s English-language films
2000s American films
2000s teen comedy films
Films about brothers